Kusal is a 2018 Sri Lankan Sinhala children's film directed by Arjuna Kamalanath and produced by Isuru Films. It stars director Arjuna Kamalanath himself with his wife Ameesha Kavindi along with child actor Thivru Dissanayake in lead roles along with Rajitha Hiran and Anura Dharmasiriwardena in supportive roles. Music composed by Ranga Fernando. It is the 1298th Sri Lankan film in the Sinhala cinema.

Plot

Cast
The film has an ensemble cast. The film also stars a trained dog and a macaque. 
 Arjuna Kamalanath as Jackie
 Ameesha Kavindi as Teesha
 Thivru Dissanayake as Kusal
 Rajitha Hiran as Somapala
 Anura Dharmasiriwardena as Edward
 Nirosha Thalagala as Geetha, Kusal's mother
 Ishan Mendis as Susantha, Kusal's father
 Chami Senanayaka as Master
 Anura Bandara Rajaguru as Hamu Mahaththaya
 Shiromika Fernando as Walawwe Menike
 Hemantha Eriyagama as Camp warden
 Premadasa Vithanage as Mudalali
 Kumari Senarathna as Janaki
 Luxman Amarasekara as Iratta
 Sandun Bandara as Kotta
 Sarath Silva as Tiger
 Gayan Weerasinghe as Guneris
Many child artists debut in the film along with lead child actor.
 Imalsha Uvindu as Little Kusal
 Senuri Nadeeshani as Somapala's daughter
 Dilmin Ranaweera as Kite boy
 Kanishka Hiruna as Pocket boy
 Sumeera Winwith as Bulty boy
 Sandaru Kumarasinghe as Dilum
 The macaque Kiriya as Punchirala
 The dog Tango as Sandy

References

External links 

2018 films
2010s Sinhala-language films